Zoë Althea Bowden  is a British physicist and instrumentation scientist who was involved in the construction of the ISIS Neutron and Muon Source. She was awarded an Order of the British Empire in the 2023 New Year Honours in recognition of her services to science.

Early life and education 
Bowden joined the Rutherford Appleton Laboratory after leaving high school. She has said that she just wanted to work in a technical role, so applied to be an Assistant Scientific Officer, a precursor to a modern apprenticeship. She was chosen to work on the Neutron Beams Unit. Here she developed the instrumentation for the Harwell linear accelerator, which was the United Kingdom's first accelerator-driven neutron source. She earned a bachelor's degree in applied physics at the London South Bank University.

Research and career 
From 1979 onward, Bowden was part of the construction team of the ISIS Neutron and Muon Source. She commissioned the IRIS spectrometer, a time-of-flight inverted-geometry crystal analyser spectrometer, and the Liquids and Amorphous Diffractometer. As there were so few people at ISIS at the time, she also worked on the construction of the High Energy Transfer instrument. She was the first instrument scientist.

She held various positions across ISIS, including overseeing User Support and being involved with the Mentorship programme. In 2014 she was made Head of Operations and Deputy Director. Beyond ISIS, Bowden was involved in discussions around neutron scattering on a global stage. In 2022 Bowden retired from ISIS, and joined UK Research and Innovation as a consultant on operations and safety. 

In 2023 Bowden was awarded an Order of the British Empire for services to science.

Select publications

Personal life 
Bowden is a bell-ringer at St Mary the Virgin, Wantage.

References 

Year of birth missing (living people)
Living people
British women physicists
20th-century British physicists
20th-century British women scientists
21st-century British physicists
21st-century British women scientists
Alumni of London South Bank University
Members of the Order of the British Empire